is a Japanese manga series by Noriyuki Matsumoto, serialized in Mag Garden's shōnen manga magazine Monthly Comic Blade since August 2011. It has been collected in nine tankōbon volumes. A 13-episode anime television series adaptation by J.C.Staff and A.C.G.T aired between January 6 and May 15, 2017.

Plot
Hiromi Maiharu has moved from Nagasaki to Kamakura and rides a bicycle to school everyday. Then she meets Tomoe Akitsuki, the president of the girls cycling club. She therefore joins the club and her life gradually begins to change.

Characters

 (drama CD), Reina Ueda (anime)
A first year student from class B at Minami Kamakura Girls High School. Hiromi and her family were moved from Nagasaki to Kamakura. She is a cheerful but slightly clumsy girl. At first, she can't ride a bicycle because she have forgotten how to ride it long time ago. But gradually, she learn many things about bicycle and began to interested with it. She began to love bicycle activities and realizes that her bicycle journey made her met so many friends. 

 (drama CD), Yuki Hirose (anime)
A first year student from class B at Minami Kamakura Girls High School, the same class as Hiromi. Tomoe is a native from Kamakura and Hiromi's first friend when she first came to Kamakura. She gets along well with Hiromi at their first meet and help her to rides bicycle in the first day of school. She also the one who guide Hiromi and their teacher, Shiki-sensei, to cycling around the ways of Kamakura. After the Night Criterium event, She is appointed by all members as a Minami Kamakura High School cycling club's president, which she agrees. She is called Tomo-chan by Hiromi.

 (drama CD), Natsumi Fujiwara (anime)
A first year Student from class C at Minami Kamakura Girls High School. Natsumi is originally from Okinawa and moved to Kamakura. She is the first member of Minami Kamakura High School cycling club that seen riding a road bike, even though she is also a beginner like her fellow club members. She is good at sports, especially swimming, that makes seniors of school's swimming club convinces her to become their member. She is good at cooking.

 (drama CD), Natsumi Takamori (anime)
A first year student from class D at Minami Kamakura Girls High School. Fuyune is a granddaughter of Minami Kamakura High School's headmaster, and became inspired from her cycling adventures. She has an older sister which is still hospitalized and promised her to begin adventures with her own feet. She still struggling in a climbing road when cycling. She is good at memorizing. 

 (drama CD), Emiko Takeuchi (anime)
A first year student from Class E at Minami Kamakuta Girls High School. Sandy is an American from Colorado who moved to Kamakura to attend high school. She made a cameo appearance in Episode 1, and appears again as Mrs. Bear (クマ さん Kuma-san) in episode 6, participated at cycling event Night Criterium inside a bear costumes. Her actual appearance is in Episode 9, where she became friends with Hiromi and the other girls, also joining the cycling club afterwards. Her close winning at the cycling race event in a bear costume proves that she has a strongest physical capabilities among all cycling club members.

 (drama CD), Sayumi Watabe (anime)
Shiki is a teacher at Minami Kamakura Girls High School and a long time cyclist rider. Later, she became the advisor of high school's cycling club. She is a new teacher in the school. Shiki also taught her students about many cycling aspects and techniques which is really helpful for the cycling club's developments. 

 (drama CD), Akari Kitō (anime)
Nagisa is Shiki's younger sister and the owner of bread shop called Bakery Flat. She is also a cyclist and knows some cycling aspects, as shown when she helps Natsumi to repair her bike's tire. Her shop sometimes become a rest area for cyclists.

 (drama CD), Ai Kakuma (anime)
Tsuru is a worker at Bakery Flat. She also often helps Korone in her shop.

 (drama CD), Yurika Kubo (anime)
Korone is the manager of bicycle shop called Cycle Flat, which is located next to Bakery Flat. People always mistaken her as a child due to her small and child-like appearance, but she is actually an adult and a cyclist that participated in an event at Taiwan.

 (anime)
Ryuko is the headmaster of Minami Kamakura Girls High School. Long time ago, when she is a high school student, she was a member of Minami Kamakura School's cycling club.

 (anime)
Yuika is Tomoe's younger sister. She design a uniform for Minami Kamakura High School Girl's cycling club.

 (anime)
A second year student at Minami Kamakura Girls High School. Hiroko is a member of the school's swim team. Initially miffed at Natsumi, a promising swimmer, choosing to join the newly created cycling club over the swim team, she nonetheless respects the girls, although is not above harassing them periodically.

Cyclists and customers of Bakery Flat.

Media

Manga
Minami Kamakura High School Girls Cycling Club, written and illustrated by Noriyuki Matsumoto, ran in Mag Garden's Monthly Comic Blade magazine from August 2011. Mag Garden collected its chapters in eleven tankōbon volumes, released from January 10, 2012.

Anime
An anime television series adaptation by J.C.Staff and A.C.G.T aired from January 6, 2017 to March 24, 2017. Crunchyroll streamed the anime. The anime ran for 12 episodes and will be released across four three episode BD/DVD volumes. An original video animation episode had been delayed and was broadcast on May 15, 2017.

Note

References

External links
 Official website 

2017 anime television series debuts
Anime series based on manga
Crunchyroll anime
Cycling in anime and manga
Mag Garden manga
Shōnen manga